Justin Merck de Jesus (born February 23, 1995), known professionally as Dave Bornea, is a Filipino YouTube personality, actor, model and dancer best known for his viral video Dubsmash "Twerk It Like Miley".

Biography
He was born in Visayas and raised on February 23, 1995, in Talisay City, Cebu and studied at University of Cebu, later the video "Twerk It Like Miley" was viral the video in social media.

He also auditioned in GMA's hit reality show StarStruck on 6th season. Dave was one of the Top 18 Survivors, along with Nikki Co, Beatriz Imperial and Camille Torres.

After joining StarStruck, he bagged supporting roles in various shows in the network, notably as Julian "Jek Jek" Balbuena in Alyas Robin Hood. He is also part of boy band One Up.

Filmography

Television

References

External links
 
 https://www.gmanetwork.com/sparkle/artists/davebornea

1995 births
Living people
Filipino male television actors
Filipino male dancers
Filipino male models
21st-century Filipino male actors
Participants in Philippine reality television series
StarStruck (Philippine TV series) participants
Male actors from Cebu
Filipino people of Spanish descent
Cebuano people
People from Talisay, Cebu
GMA Network personalities